Huanghuayuan station can refer to:
Huanghuayuan station (Chengdu Metro), a metro station in Chengdu, China
Huanghuayuan station (Chongqing Rail Transit), a metro station in Chongqing, China